Diver is a railway point and unincorporated place in the southwest corner of geographic La Salle Township in the Unorganized North Part of Nipissing District in Northeastern Ontario, Canada. It was created during the construction of the Ontario Northland Railway in the early 20th century. Diver is located on the railway line between the dispersed rural community of Otter to the north and the railway point of Osborne to the south. It has no railway siding.

Diver is also just outside the northwest corner of Jocko Rivers Provincial Park.

A tertiary road leads from Diver: northeast to the community of McLaren's Bay on Lake Timiskaming; or, via a subsequent branching tertiary road, southeast to Ontario Highway 63, at a point about halfway between that highway's crossing over the Jocko River and Lake Timiskaming.

References

Communities in Nipissing District